Owney may refer to:

People
 Owney Madden (1891–1965) New York gangster
 Owney Geoghegan (1840–1885) boxer

Places in Ireland
 Owney and Arra, County Tipperary barony
 Owneybeg, County Limerick barony

Other
 Owney (dog), New York post office mascot

See also
 Oney (song), a song recorded by Johnny Cash
 Owen (name), Owney is hypocoristic form
 Uaithne, name anglicised Owney